This is a list of countries by 25- to 64-year-olds having completed tertiary education as published by the OECD. It includes some non-OECD nations.

Tertiary education is the educational level following the completion of a school providing a secondary education. The World Bank, for example, defines tertiary education as including universities as well as institutions that teach specific capacities of higher learning such as colleges, technical training institutes, community colleges, nursing schools, research laboratories, centers of excellence, and distance learning centers.

2019 OECD data

This list includes non-OECD member countries: Brazil, China, Costa Rica, Indonesia, Russia, Saudi Arabia, and South Africa.
{| class="wikitable sortable" style="text-align:center"
|-  style="background:#ececec; vertical-align:top;"
! rowspan="2" |Country
! rowspan="2" |Age25–64(%)
! colspan="4" |Age
! rowspan="2" |Year
! rowspan="2" |Non-OECD
|-
! 25–34(%)!!35–44(%)!!45–54(%)!!55–64(%)
|-
| align=left| ||42||48||46||38||33||2014||
|-
| align=left| ||30||38||33||27||21||2014||
|-
| align=left| ||37||44||42||34||26||2014||
|-
| align=left| ||14||15||14||14||11||2013||
|-
| align=left| ||54||58||61||51||45||2014||
|-
| align=left| ||21||27||24||17||14||2013||
|-
| align=left| ||17||27||15||7||2||2018||
|-
| align=left| ||22||28||23||18||16||2014||
|-
| align=left| ||18||21||19||17||17||2014||
|-
| align=left| ||22||30||21||20||15||2014||
|-
| align=left| ||36||42||41||33||29||2014||
|-
| align=left| ||38||40||39||35||36||2014||
|-
| align=left| ||42||40||50||44||34||2014||
|-
| align=left| ||32||44||39||26||20||2013||
|-
| align=left| ||27||28||29||26||25||2014||
|-
| align=left| ||28||39||27||26||21||2014||
|-
| align=left| ||23||32||25||20||17||2014||
|-
| align=left| ||37||41||42||36||29||2014||
|-
| align=left| ||8||10||9||8||4||2011||
|-
| align=left| ||41||51||49||34||24||2014||
|-
| align=left| ||49||46||53||48||47||2014||
|-
| align=left| ||17||24||19||13||12||2014||
|-
| align=left| ||48||59||53||47||35||2014||
|-
| align=left| ||30||39||31||27||23||2014||
|-
| align=left| ||37||53||38||30||28||2014||
|-
| align=left| ||46||53||56||40||32||2014||
|-
| align=left| ||19||25||17||16||13||2014||
|-
| align=left| ||34||44||38||30||27||2014||
|-
| align=left| ||36||40||41||32||29||2014||
|-
| align=left| ||42||49||49||36||32||2014||
|-
| align=left| ||27||43||32||18||14||2014||
|-
| align=left| ||22||31||26||17||13||2014||
|-
| align=left| ||54||58||55||53||50||2013||
|-
| align=left| ||22||26||22||18||14||2013||
|-
| align=left| ||20||30||21||15||14||2014||
|-
| align=left| ||29||38||35||24||18||2014||
|-
| align=left| ||7||5||7||8||7||2012||
|-
| align=left| ||45||68||56||33||17||2014||
|-
| align=left| ||35||41||43||30||21||2014||
|-
| align=left| ||39||46||46||32||30||2014||
|-
| align=left| ||40||46||45||38||31||2014||
|-
| align=left| ||17||25||16||10||10||2014||
|-
| align=left| ||45||X||X||X||X||2015||
|-
| align=left| ||42||49||46||38||35||2014||
|-
| align=left| ||44||46||47||43||41||2014||

Countries by level of tertiary education
This is a list of countries by the level of tertiary education completed by 25–34 year olds measured by the percent of the population. This list contains the percentage of 25–34 year olds that have obtained at least a 2-year tertiary degree or its equivalent (an associate degree in the United States); the percentage of 25–34 year olds that have completed a 4-year degree or higher (a bachelor's degree in the United States); and the percentage of 25–34 year olds that have completed a 6-year degree or higher (a master's degree in the United States).

See also
Education by country
List of universities and colleges by country
List of countries by secondary education attainment

Notes

References

External links
Tertiary education statistics, UNESCO
 Quality Research International – (Glossary)

Educational stages
International rankings
Population statistics
Tertiary education
Lists of countries